The Steinhart–Hart equation is a model of the resistance of a semiconductor at different temperatures. The equation is

 
where
  is the temperature (in kelvins),

Uses of the equation
The equation is often used to derive a precise temperature of a thermistor, since it provides a closer approximation to actual temperature than simpler equations, and is useful over the entire working temperature range of the sensor.  Steinhart–Hart coefficients are usually published by thermistor manufacturers.

Where Steinhart–Hart coefficients are not available, they can be derived. Three accurate measures of resistance are made at precise temperatures, then the coefficients are derived by solving three simultaneous equations.

Inverse of the equation
To find the resistance of a semiconductor at a given temperature, the inverse of the Steinhart–Hart equation must be used.  See the Application Note, "A, B, C Coefficients for Steinhart–Hart Equation".
 
where

Steinhart–Hart coefficients
To find the coefficients of Steinhart–Hart, we need to know at-least three operating points. For this, we use three values of resistance data for three known temperatures.
 

Developers of the equation
The equation is named after John S. Steinhart and Stanley R. Hart who first published the relationship in 1968. Professor Steinhart (1929–2003), a fellow of the American Geophysical Union and of the American Association for the Advancement of Science, was a member of the faculty of University of Wisconsin–Madison from 1969 to 1991. Dr. Hart, a Senior Scientist at Woods Hole Oceanographic Institution since 1989 and fellow of the Geological Society of America, the American Geophysical Union, the Geochemical Society and the European Association of Geochemistry, was associated with Professor Steinhart at the Carnegie Institution of Washington when the equation was developed.

Derivation and alternatives 

The most general form of the equation can be derived from extending the B parameter equation to an infinite series:
 
 
 

 is a reference (standard) resistance value. The Steinhart–Hart equation assumes  is 1 ohm. The curve fit is much less accurate when it is assumed  and a different value of  such as 1 kΩ is used. However, using the full set of coefficients avoids this problem as it simply results in shifted parameters.

In the original paper, Steinhart and Hart remark that allowing  degraded the fit. This is surprising as allowing more freedom would usually improve the fit. Subsequent papers have found great benefit in allowing .

The equation was developed through trial-and-error testing of numerous equations, and selected due to its simple form and good fit. However, in its original form, the Steinhart–Hart equation is not sufficiently accurate for modern scientific measurements. For interpolation using a small number of measurements, the series expansion with  has been found to be accurate within 1 mK over the calibrated range. Some authors recommend using . If there are many data points, standard polynomial regression can also generate accurate curve fits. Some manufacturers have begun providing regression coefficients as an alternative to Steinhart–Hart coefficients.

References

External links
Steinhart-Hart Coefficient Calculator Online
Steinhart-Hart Coefficient Calculator Java

Semiconductors